Dallas is a surname of Scottish and English origin, as well as a given name. When of Scottish origin the name is a habitational name, derived from Dallas near Forres. This place-name is likely derived from the British dol "meadow" + gwas "dwelling" (compare Gaelic dail + fas). This name also appears in County Londonderry, Northern Ireland. When of English origin the name is a habitational name, derived from the Old English dæl, or Old Norse dalr "valley" + hus "house". An example of such a derivation is Dalehouse in North Yorkshire. The name can also be a topographic name, derived in the same fashion.

Surname 

The surname, when of Scottish origin, is considered by some to be a sept of Clan Mackintosh.

 Alexander Grant Dallas (1816–1882), Canadian fur trader and official
 Alexander J. Dallas (statesman) (1759–1817),  U.S. Secretary of the Treasury under President James Madison; father of George Mifflin Dallas
 Alexander J. Dallas (United States Navy officer) (1791–1844),  U.S. Navy officer; brother of George M. Dallas
 Chad Dallas (born 2000), American baseball player
 Darcy Dallas (born 1972), Canadian ice hockey player
 DeeJay Dallas (born 1998), American football player
 DeVan Dallas (1926–2016), American politician
 Eneas Sweetland Dallas (1828–1879), Scottish journalist
 George M. Dallas (1792–1864), 11th Vice President of the United States of America (1845-1849)
 Hugh Dallas (born 1957), former Scottish football (soccer) referee
 Ian Dallas (Abdalqadir as-Sufi) (1930–2021), Scottish author and Muslim convert
 Irene Dallas (1883–1971) and Hilda Dallas (1878–1958) were British suffragette sisters
 John Dallas (1878–1942), Scottish rugby union player and referee
 Josh Dallas (born 1978), American actor
 Karl Dallas (1931–2016), British writer, musician, and activist
 Leroy Dallas (1909–1967), American blues guitarist, singer and songwriter
 Matt Dallas (born 1982), American actor
 Robert Dallas (1756–1824), British judge
 Rosalind Dallas (1949-2015), British graphic designer
 Sandra Dallas, American author
 Stuart Dallas (born 1991), Northern Ireland soccer player
 Winifred Dallas-Yorke (1863–1954), Duchess of Portland

Given name

 Dallas, a former ring name of professional wrestler Lance Hoyt (born 1977)
 Dallas Adams (1947–1991), actor
 Dallas Austin (born 1970), American songwriter, producer and instrumentalist
 Dallas Braden (born 1983), professional American baseball player
 Dallas Campbell (born 1970), British television presenter
 Dallas Clark (born 1979), professional American football player
 Dallas Comegys (born 1964), former professional basketball player
 Ryan Dallas Cook (1982–2005), ska trombonist
 Dallas Drake (born 1969), pro ice hockey player
 Dallas Frazier (1939–2022), American country musician and songwriter
 Dallas Goedert (born 1995), American football player
 Dallas Green (1934–2017), pro baseball player, manager and executive
 Dallas Green (born 1980), guitarist, singer and pianist of Alexisonfire and City and Colour
 Bryce Dallas Howard (born 1981), actress
 Dallas Johnson (born 1982), Australian rugby league player
 Dallas Keuchel (born 1988), American baseball player
 Dallas Long (born 1940), Olympic champion shotputter
 Dallas McKennon (1919–2009), American actor
 Dallas Moir (born 1957), Scottish cricketer
 Diamond Dallas Page (born 1956), American professional wrestler
 Dallas Reid (born 1993), American voice actor
 Dallas Reynolds (born 1984), American football player
 Dallas Seavey (born 1987), Iditarod musher
 Dallas Smith (born 1941), former pro ice hockey player
 Dallas Smith (born 1977), singer for the Canadian band Default
 Dallas Soonias (born 1984), Canadian volleyball player
 Dallas Taylor (1948–2015), an American session drummer
 Dallas Taylor (born 1980), vocalist for the band Maylene and the Sons of Disaster
 Dallas Thomas (born 1989), American football player
 Dallas Wiens (born 1985), the first United States recipient of a full face transplant
 Dallas Willard (1935–2013), an American Christian philosopher
 Dallas Woods, an Indigenous Australian rapper

Fictional characters named Dallas 
 Korben Dallas, ex-soldier and unlikely hero cab-driver played by Bruce Willis in the movie The Fifth Element, set in the 23rd century
 Stella Dallas, title character of a 1923 novel and numerous subsequent theatrical, radio, and film versions
 Steve Dallas, a character in the American comic strips of Berke Breathed, most famously Bloom County
 Larry Dallas, Jack Tripper's best friend from the ABC sitcom Three's Company (1977–1984)
 Dallas, a character in the 1979 film Alien, captain of the starship Nostromo, played by Tom Skerritt

 Eve Dallas, the lead character in J.D. Robb's in Death series of mysteries
 Mike Dallas, fictional character in Degrassi
 Dallas, a minor character in the 2001 science fiction horror film Jason X, played by Todd Farmer
 Dallas, recurring character in Austin & Ally
 Dallas Genoard, a character from the light novels and anime series Baccano!
 Dallas, a skilled criminal and one of the four playable characters in Payday: The Heist
 Dallas, a prostitute with a heart of gold, played by Claire Trevor in the 1939 film Stagecoach
 Dallas Winston, played by Matt Dillon, a “greaser punk” who “stays gold” in the 1983 Francis Ford Coppola film “The Outsiders” See also: Dallas Winston, a character in S. E. Hinton’s novel “The Outsiders”

See also 
 Dallas (disambiguation), other uses of Dallas on Wikipedia

References 

English masculine given names
Scottish masculine given names